Ravela Kishore Babu is an Indian politician. He was MLA from Prathipadu in the 2014 Andhra Pradesh Legislative Assembly election. He was once a member of the Telugu Desam Party. He quit TDP in 2018 and joined Jana Sena Party. In June 2019 he quit JSP in order to join Bharatiya Janata Party. In 2022 he quit BJP citing personal reasons. In January 2023 he joined BRS.

Babu is a retired IRTS officer.

References

Living people
Year of birth missing (living people)
Andhra Pradesh MLAs 2014–2019
People from Guntur district
Jana Sena Party politicians
Bharatiya Janata Party politicians from Andhra Pradesh
Telugu Desam Party politicians